The Arizona woodpecker (Leuconotopicus arizonae) is a woodpecker native to southern Arizona and New Mexico and the Sierra Madre Occidental of western Mexico. The species' northernmost range in southeastern Arizona, extreme southwestern New Mexico, and northern Sonora is the region of the Madrean Sky Islands, a region of higher Sonoran Desert mountain ranges.

Taxonomy
This species is known in older field guides as a subspecies of Strickland's woodpecker.  The 42nd supplement of the American Ornithologists Union checklist officially split Strickland's woodpecker into two species: the northern population in the Sierra Madre Occidental region (Arizona, L. arizonae) and the southern population in central Mexico (Strickland's, L. stricklandi). Some taxonomic authorities, including the American Ornithological Society, continue to place this species in the genus Picoides.

Description

Their plumage is mainly brown and white in coloration, brown on top with a dark rump with white underparts speckled with brown spots. Arizona woodpeckers usually have white bars on their wings, and have two white stripes across their face which join with another white bar on their neck. Male Arizona woodpeckers also have a red patch on the nape of their head which is lacking on females.

The call of the Arizona woodpecker is a sharp, squeaky keech, and this species also gives a rattle call of descending, grating notes.

References

 
 Sibley, David Allen.  The Sibley Field Guide to Birds of Western North America,

External links
 Arizona woodpecker at AviBase
 Arizona woodpecker at eNature
 Arizona woodpecker at HikeArizona.COM
 Arizona woodpecker at USGS
Arizona woodpecker photo gallery VIREO
Phote-High Res; Article "friends of Madera Canyon" friendsofmaderacanyon.org

Arizona woodpecker
Endemic birds of Southwestern North America
Native birds of the Southwestern United States
Fauna of the Chihuahuan Desert
Birds of Mexico
Birds of the Sierra Madre Occidental
Birds of the Trans-Mexican Volcanic Belt
Arizona woodpecker